Haasbroek is a surname. Notable people with the surname include:

 Francois Haasbroek (born 1987), South African cricketer who has played for North West and Free State
 Ruan Haasbroek (born 1997), South African cricketer who has played for North West
 Pieter Haasbroek, South African cricketer who has played for Limpopo